Demetrius Shipp Jr. (born November 20, 1988) is an American actor. He portrayed rapper and actor Tupac Shakur in the 2017 biopic All Eyez on Me, as well as gang leader Tyrone Moore in All American.

Shipp was cast in the role of Tupac in 2011, after a friend suggested he audition given his strong resemblance to the legendary hip-hop artist. Shipp remarked in an interview that he "never aspired to act." Principal photography did not begin until 2015, and the film was released in June 2017. Shipp's father worked with Tupac Shakur on the 1996 album The Don Killuminati: The 7 Day Theory on the song "Toss It Up".

Shipp worked at Target and Dish Network prior to his acting career.

Filmography

Film

Television

Self

References

External links
 

Living people
African-American male actors
American male film actors
21st-century American male actors
1988 births
Male actors from California
People from Carson, California
Tupac Shakur